The British Academy for the Promotion of Historical, Philosophical and Philological Studies is the United Kingdom's national academy for the humanities and the social sciences.
It was established in 1902 and received its royal charter in the same year. It is now a fellowship of more than 1,000 leading scholars spanning all disciplines across the humanities and social sciences and a funding body for research projects across the United Kingdom. The academy is a self-governing and independent registered charity, based at 10–11 Carlton House Terrace in London.

The British Academy is funded with an annual grant from the Department for Business, Innovation and Skills (BIS). In 2014–15, the British Academy's total income was £33,100,000, including £27,000,000 from BIS. £32,900,000 was distributed during the year in research grants, awards and charitable activities.

Purposes

The academy states that it has five fundamental purposes:
 To speak up for the humanities and the social sciences
 To invest in the very best researchers and research
 To inform and enrich debate around society's greatest questions
 To ensure sustained international engagement and collaboration
 To make the most of the Academy's assets to secure the Academy for the future.

History

The creation of a "British Academy for the Promotion of Historical, Philosophical and Philological Studies" was first proposed in 1899 in order that Britain could be represented at meetings of European and American academies. The organisation, which has since become simply "the British Academy", was initiated as an unincorporated society on 17 December 1901, and received its Royal Charter from King Edward VII on 8 August 1902.

Since then, many of Britain's most distinguished scholars in the humanities and social sciences have been involved in the life of the academy, including John Maynard Keynes, Isaiah Berlin, C. S. Lewis and Henry Moore.

Until 1927–28 the academy had no premises. Then it moved to some rooms in No. 6 Burlington Gardens. In 1968 it moved the short distance to Burlington House. It subsequently moved to headquarters near Regent's Park. Then in 1998 the Academy moved to its present headquarters in Carlton House Terrace. Overlooking St James's Park, the terrace was designed by John Nash and built in the 1820s and 1830s. Number 10 was formerly the London residence of the Ridley family and number 11 was from 1856 to 1875 the home of Prime Minister William Gladstone.

In March 2010, the academy embarked on a £2.75m project to renovate and restore the public rooms in No. 11, following the departure of former tenant the Foreign Press Association, and link the two buildings together. The work was completed in January 2011 and the new spaces include a new 150-seat Wolfson Auditorium are available for public hire. In addition to offices for its staff 10 - 11 Carlton House Terrace is used for academy conferences and events  and parts of the building are available on a private hire basis for events.

The history, problems and achievements of the academy have been recorded in works by two of its secretaries. Sir Frederic Kenyon's volume of 37 pages covers the years up to 1951; Sir Mortimer Wheeler's volume covers the years 1949 to 1968.

Fellowship 

Election as a Fellow of the British Academy recognises high scholarly distinction in the humanities or social sciences, evidenced by published work. Fellows may use the letters FBA after their names. Fellows are elected into one of the following disciplinary sections:

Humanities
 Classical Antiquity
 Theology and Religious Studies
 African and Oriental Studies
 Linguistics and Philology
 Early Modern Languages and Literatures
 Modern Languages, Literatures and other Media
 Archaeology
 Medieval Studies
 Early Modern History to c1800
 Modern History from c1800
 History of Art and Music
 Philosophy
 Culture, Media and Performance

Social Sciences
 Law
 Economics and Economic History
 Anthropology and Geography
 Sociology, Demography and Social Statistics
 Political Studies: Political Theory, Government and International Relations
 Psychology
 Management and Business Studies
 Education

Funding schemes 

The British Academy channels substantial public funding into support for individuals and organisations pursuing humanities and social sciences research and scholarship in the UK and overseas. These funding schemes are designed to aid scholars at different stages of their academic career and include postdoctoral fellowships, Wolfson Research Professorships, Leverhulme Senior Research Fellowships, small research grants and British Academy Research Projects.

In addition to its main public funds supported by the Department for Business, Innovation and Skills, the academy also draws on private funds arising from gifts, legacies, contributions made by fellows and grants from research foundations to support a further range of research activities. In 2014/15, the academy received around £30m to support research and researchers across the humanities and social sciences. Funds available to the academy were invested in the following main areas: research career development; a portfolio of research grant opportunities, and international engagement. The demand and quality of applications submitted for academy funding remains high. This year the academy received around 3,600 applications and made 588 awards to scholars based in around 100 different universities across the UK – a success rate of 16 per cent.

International work 

In order to promote the interests of UK research and learning around the world, the Academy works to create frameworks to support international networking and collaboration and develop the role of humanities and social sciences research in tackling global challenges.  It draws on expertise from a wide range of sources from within the fellowship and on specialist advice from its seven Area Panels for Africa, China, the Middle East, Europe, South Asia, and Latin America/Caribbean.

The Academy also funds and coordinates a network of overseas institutes which provide local expertise, logistical support and often a working base for UK scholars. These include research institutes in Amman, Ankara, Athens, Jerusalem, Nairobi, Rome and Tehran, as well as UK-based specialist learned societies which run strategic research programmes in other parts of the world including Africa, Latin America and South and South East Asia.

Higher education and research 

As the UK's national voice for the humanities and social sciences, the British Academy seeks to promote and protect the interests and health of these disciplines and their research base. It makes independent representations to the government and other bodies on relevant higher education and research issues, contributes statements and submissions to formal consultations and organises a range of policy events and discussions, liaising regularly with learned societies, universities, national academies and other relevant organisations.

British Academy's policy work 

The British Academy's Fellowship represents breadth and excellence of expertise across these disciplines, and the Academy's policy work is dedicated to applying that insight to policy issues for public benefit and societal well-being. The goal is to enlighten the context, meaning and practicalities of policy challenges. This work is meant to bring independence, authority and objectivity to complex issues, such as public policy, skills, education and research. From reports to small meetings, the British Academy provides a forum for examining issues that are important for the society and the economy.

Public events

The British Academy organises a wide-ranging annual programme of more than 50 public lectures, panel discussions, conferences and seminars showcasing new research and debating topical issues. This includes a number of long-established lecture series, such as the Shakespeare Lecture, first given in 1911. Most events are free and most take place at the Academy's headquarters in Carlton House Terrace

Award of prizes

The British Academy awards a total of 15 prizes and medals, most of them awarded annually.

British Academy President's Medal, created in 2010 and awarded to up to five recipients each year who have demonstrated "signal service to the cause of the humanities and social sciences"
British Academy Medal, created in 2013 and awarded to up to three recipients each year "for landmark academic achievement in any of the humanities and social science disciplines supported by the Academy"
Burkitt Medal, created in 1923
Kenyon Medal, first awarded in 1957
Leverhulme Medal and Prize, created in 2002
British Academy Book Prize for Global Cultural Understanding, established in 2013
Peter Townsend Policy Press Prize, created in 2011
Wiley Prize in Psychology, first awarded in 2009
Wiley Prize in Economics, first awarded in 2013
Brian Barry Prize in Political Science, first awarded in 2014
Serena Medal, first awarded in 1920
Edward Ullendorff Medal, first awarded in 2012
Rose Mary Crawshay Prize, first awarded in 1916
Grahame Clark Medal, first awarded in 1993
Sir Israel Gollancz Prize, first awarded in 1925
Landscape Archaeology Medal, first awarded in 2007
Neil & Saras Smith Medal for Linguistics, first awarded in 2014
Derek Allen Prize, first awarded in 1977

Presidents of the British Academy

The Lord Reay 1902–1907
Sir Edward Maunde Thompson 1907–1909
Samuel Henry Butcher 1909–1910
Sir Adolphus Ward 1911–1913
The Viscount Bryce 1913–1917
Sir Frederic Kenyon 1917–1921
The Earl of Balfour 1921–1928
H. A. L. Fisher 1928–1932
John William Mackail 1932–1936
Sir David Ross 1936–1940
Sir J. H. Clapham 1940–1946
Sir Idris Bell 1946–1950
Sir Charles Kingsley Webster 1950–1954
Sir George Norman Clark 1954–1958
Sir Maurice Bowra 1958–1962
The Lord Robbins 1962–1967
Sir Kenneth Clinton Wheare 1967–1971
Sir Denys Lionel Page 1971–1974
Sir Isaiah Berlin 1974–1978
Sir Kenneth Dover 1978–1981
Owen Chadwick 1981–1985
Sir Randolph Quirk 1985–1989
Sir Anthony Kenny 1989–1993
Sir Keith Thomas 1993–1997
Sir Tony Wrigley 1997–2001
The Viscount Runciman of Doxford 2001–2004
The Baroness O'Neill of Bengarve 2005–2009
Sir Adam Roberts 2009–2013
The Lord Stern of Brentford 2013–2017
Sir David Cannadine 2017–2021
Julia Black 2021–2025

Secretaries of the British Academy

 Sir Israel Gollancz (1902–1930)
 Sir Frederic G. Kenyon (1930–1949)
 Sir Mortimer Wheeler (1949–1968)
 Derek Allen (1969–1973)
 N. J. Williams (1973–1977)
 J. P. Carswell (1978–1983)
 P. W. H. Brown (1983–2006)
 Robin Jackson (2006–2015)
 Alun Evans (2015–2019)
 Hetan Shah (2020-)

Publications
Lectures and conferences papers

Monographs

Research series

See also
:Category:Fellows of the British Academy
Royal Society

References

External links
 
 Carlton House Terrace

 
1902 establishments in the United Kingdom
Charities based in London
Department for Business, Innovation and Skills
National academies of arts and humanities
Scientific organizations established in 1902
Scientific organisations based in the United Kingdom
Members of the International Science Council